Pat Smith (born September 21, 1970) is a former folkstyle and freestyle wrestler. He competed collegiately at Oklahoma State University (OSU) and later served as an assistant coach at OSU. During his collegiate wrestling career, Smith became the first four-time NCAA Division I champion in the sport's history. His older brother is John Smith, who was a six-time gold medalist at the World and Olympic levels, and is the head wrestling coach at Oklahoma State.

Biography

High School
Smith attended Del City High School in Del City, Oklahoma. While wrestling in high school, he would win three Oklahoma state championships (1987–1989) and was twice named Most Outstanding Wrestler at the state tournament.

College
Smith made wrestling history during his college career, when he became the first wrestler to win four NCAA Division I individual national championships. He earned NCAA titles in 1990, 1991, 1992 and 1994. He was a member of Oklahoma State teams that won the NCAA team titles in 1990 and 1994. Smith ended his college career with a 121-5-2 record, and set the Oklahoma State record for most consecutive wins without a loss with 98 straight.

International
He would also have a successful freestyle wrestling career. He finished second at the 1996 U.S. Olympic Team Trials and second at the 1995 U.S. Freestyle Nationals. In total, he was a six-time U.S. Freestyle Nationals All-American. Smith won a bronze medal at the 1997 Wrestling World Cup, representing the United States.

Coaching
Following his competitive career, Smith served as an assistant coach at Oklahoma State. He would help Oklahoma State win four straight NCAA team titles from 2003 to 2006. Smith resigned as Oklahoma State's assistant coach on May 1, 2006. 

In 2008, Pat Smith started running and coaching the Arkansas Wrestling Academy and the youth club the Mighty Bluebirds in Little Rock, Arkansas. At the Arkansas Wrestling Academy, Smith teaches and coaches folkstyle technique, along with freestyle in the summer. Smith has also served as the head coach of the Arkansas Junior/Cadet National Teams. Since living in Little Rock, Smith has already produced multiple state champions, national finalists, and All-Americans in the sport. Smith has had past AWA wrestlers attend schools such as Oklahoma State University, Ouachita Baptist University, Central Baptist College, Army at Westpoint, and King's College.

Smith was inducted into the National Wrestling Hall of Fame as a Distinguished Member in 2006.

Additional Reading
 Dellinger, Bob & Doris. 1994. The Cowboys Ride Again. Oklahoma Bylines Inc. 
 Hammond, Jairus K. 2005. The History of Collegiate Wrestling. National Wrestling Hall of Fame and Museum. 
 Parrish, Kim D. 2007. Cowboy Up. Oklahoma Heritage Association.

References

1970 births
Living people
American wrestlers
Oklahoma State Cowboys wrestlers